Re-evaluation Counseling (RC) is an organization that practices a procedure – 'co-counseling' – in which people try to help each other deal with the effects of emotional hurt through catharsis (called "discharge"). The process and theory of co-counseling were developed in the 1950's in Seattle, WA, USA by Harvey Jackins.

In the early 1970s Personal Counselors, Inc, established the Re-evaluation Counseling Community, made up of local groups of people called "Co-Counselors" in Seattle and beyond, based until 2021 in Seattle, WA, currently in Shoreline WA. It was led by Harvey Jackins until his death in 1999. It is currently led by his son Tim Jackins.

History 
In the early 1950's Jackins associated with L. Ron Hubbard (the founder of Scientology) and others interested in Dianetics (what later became Scientology). This led Jackins to establish Personal Counselors Inc. which aimed to "engage in, conduct and teach the art and science of Dianetics." RC reports that collaboration between Jackins and Hubbard became unworkable, and Jackins ended their association and continued to develop RC as a separate organization.

During the late 1950s and early 1960s, Jackins continued to build Personal Counselors, Inc., and in the 1960s and 1970s took RC from Seattle, where he first practiced it, to the rest of the US and then to other countries. Between 1975 and 1990, he appointed local teachers, area representatives, regional leaders and representatives of groups such as women, African Americans, and Lesbians and Gay Men. A set of Guidelines for the community was adopted a biennial conference of local leaders. The Guidelines are revised at similar conferences, known as "World Conferences", originally biennial but currently every four years. The conferences also adopt general goals for the community.

After Jackins' death in 1999, his son, Tim Jackins, was chosen at a conference, attended by leaders in the RC communities worldwide, to take over the role of International Reference Person, the title given to the leader of RC.

The RC Community has at times attracted controversy and criticism.

Therapeutic theory 
Re-evaluation Counseling describes itself as "a process for freeing humans and society as a whole from distress patterns so that we may resume intelligent functioning." Counseling is practiced in pairs ("co-counseling"), in which the participants listen to one another in turn and help one other to "discharge" the "hurts" from past experiences. RC theorizes that discharge, which is indicated by processes including crying, laughing, shaking and yawning, will heal a person from emotional trauma.

No money is exchanged by the co-counselors but they pay fees to teachers and workshop leaders when attending classes or workshops.

RC works from a set of assumptions, including "everyone is born good and intelligent" and "all hurts are acquired". The theory assumes that inappropriate or hurtful behavior is caused by "restimulation" (a term coined originally for Dianetics) of past hurts that have not been properly discharged. If "discharge" can be completed, the behavior will not be repeated.

Co-counselors meet to have "sessions" together in pairs or small groups to achieve "discharge."  Co-counselors are also encouraged to improve their counseling skills and deepen their involvement in the community by attending classes and workshops. Personal Counselors, Inc. offers one-way counseling intensives to community leaders for which a fee is charged.

RC questions the use of psychiatric drugs and the standard concept of mental illness. Members are discouraged from using medications at workshops, including caffeine. The editor of the Brunner-Routledge series of books on "Advancing Theory in Therapy" says that while Re-evaluation Counseling is not generally regarded as a psychotherapy, "it has made and continues to make an important contribution to our understanding of human beings and human situations." In particular, according to Ron Roberts, author of The Off -Modern, "Co-counseling theory proposes that the practical job of the counselor is to therefore challenge or contradict the meaningful content of these distress recordings so that they are not mistaken for reality. When this is done sufficiently, a process of emotional discharge (laughter, crying, talking, raging, shaking, sweating, yawning) takes place and is accompanied by a spontaneous reprocessing and re-evaluation of the information originally containing in the distress recording.... the distressed person (client) returns to a flexible, more relaxed level of functioning."

RC's has ambitious social and environmental objectives, including, "The transformation of society to a rational, peaceful, non-exploitative, classless form world-wide. The preservation of all existing species of life and the re-creation of extinguished species. The preservation of wilderness areas and the creation of a completely benign environment over most of the earth, the oceans, and the atmosphere. The exploration of, and eventually becoming at home in, space."

RC has controversial views on LGBT issues. Its "gay policy" that “participation in sex with a human of your own gender is based on distress. It arises only out of distress experiences in the past. The distress out of which it arises can become unoccluded,[sic] (if it has been occluded) and can be completely discharged.”

Media 
Co-counseling was recently the focus of a 2021 investigation by the Boston Globe, after a youth worker in the school system was found to be practicing co-counseling (which is not a licensed therapy program) with minors without the permission of the student's parents.

Quoting from the Boston Globe: "Boston high school sophomore, Keondre McClay said he was pressured by the head of a district-sponsored youth advocacy program to attend an overnight retreat in Newton, where white adults asked the Black teenager to wrestle out his emotions on a gym mat with them. They said it would help him purge his trauma from experiencing racism. McClay fled to his room. Jenny Sazama, the program leader, and other retreat participants chased after him. For more than an hour, he recalled recently, they hugged him on his bed and entreated him to return to the group “counseling” session while he hid under the covers screaming, “Please leave me alone!”.

In response to this media attention, RC published the "Listening Well" website which aims to portray the organization in a positive light.

Organization 
The organization's official title is "The International Re-evaluation Counseling Communities". It is resourced by Re-evaluation Counseling Community Resources, Inc., with headquarters in Shoreline, Washington, USA. Its president is Tim Jackins and its vice president is Sarah Elizabeth Jackins. The corporation owns trademark in the terms "Re-evaluation Counseling", "RC" and "United to End Racism". It also controls the Re-evaluation Foundation, a non-profit 501(c) organization, and Rational Island Publishers.

Within RC, Tim Jackins is called the "International Reference Person". He is a former community college mathematics teacher from Palo Alto, California, and a graduate of Yale and Stanford. He has been a co-counselor, leader and teacher of RC for most of his life. The International Reference Person appoints senior leaders ("reference persons") in consultation with local groups. Local groups choose local leaders. Reference persons are consulted about who can attend events, teach RC, and lead groups. No reference person is paid.

RC runs classes in co-counseling and local groups are set up by people experienced in the ideas and methods of RC who have been approved by the leaders. New members are invited to join "fundamentals" classes by existing members. They are expected to be well-functioning and emotionally healthy so that they can be effective counselors as well as being able to benefit from counseling. Fees are fixed at a low hourly rate per person, and there are scholarships for people on low incomes. Twenty-five per cent of fees are sent to the central body in Shoreline. Participants are asked not to use caffeine or alcohol and to abstain from mind-altering drugs so as to be attentive and to have access to their feelings. People who counsel together are requested and expected to refrain from socializing with one another.

Classes and local communities are organized into regions and loose, country-wide affiliations, although RC does not organize on national lines.

RC is committed to offering RC practices and insights "as widely as possible in the general population". RC does not seek publicity Local publicity has to be approved by the regional leader and national and international publicity by the leader of RC. RC does not list local contact information on its website.

RC does not publish membership figures or comment on estimates. On one occasion, Jackins claimed that more than a million had attended RC "Fundamentals" classes.

Re-evaluation Counseling encourages its members to play an active role in public life and has set up groups to promote its ideas, which it calls "naturalized" groups. The main groups promoting RC methods are United to End Racism" (UER), formed in 2000, and Sustaining All Life, formed in 2015. UER is part of RC and shares its HQ in Shoreline. It participated in the 2001 Durban World Conference against Racism, the 2006 Caracas World Social Forum and the 2006 Vancouver World Peace Forum. Sustaining All Life participated in the United Nations Climate Change Conference (Conference of the Parties or COPs) every year since the 2015 COP in Paris. The COPs were in Marrakech, Morocco (COP22 in 2016); Bonn, Germany (COP23 in 2017); Katowice, Poland (COP24 in 2018); and Madrid, Spain (COP25 in 2019). Other organisations that are independent of RC are led by RC community members and draw to some extent on RC concepts. An example is the National Coalition Building Institute whose Founder-Executive Director, Cherie R. Brown, is a member of RC and active in UER.

The Re-evaluation Foundation aims "To provide opportunities for people to participate in Re-evaluation counseling who otherwise could not afford to participate." Founded in 1972, it supports projects based on the theory and practice of Re-evaluation Counseling that apply "bold, thoughtful action to freeing human beings from the distresses associated with past hurtful, unjust experiences." Its president is Michael Markovits, a former vice-president of IBM. Its assets at the end of 2006 were approximately $1M. "The Foundation considers grant requests only from members of the Re-evaluation Counseling Communities who are seeking financial assistance that will further the dissemination of the theory and practice of RC." In 2007, the foundation made grants to several organizations initiated by Re-evaluation Counseling, including "People-of-Color Leadership Development, Global Initiatives, Young People Leadership Development/Family Counseling Work, Elimination of Racism, and Mental Health."

Criticism 
There have been few papers about RC in scholarly journals and RC tends not to co-operate with attempts at independent investigation.

Dennis Tourish and Pauline Irving in a 1995 article compared his system of management to the communist state model of democratic centralism.

The organisation is sensitive to criticism, either external or internal, which it regards as an attack on the organization. Jackins believed that much criticism was inspired by the hostility of the US government to RC's "profoundly progressive nature and its effectiveness". RC instructs members "to quickly interrupt both attacks and gossip", which are "dramatizations of distress" and unacceptable behaviors within the RC Community. It says that "An attack is not an effective way to resolve disagreements or difficulties." The organisation requires that "People who participate in an attack must first stop the attack and apologize for having participated in it", after which they are to be offered counseling. Critics who persist "should be made to leave the group and their attacks ignored." Steve Carr criticized RC for this prevention of internal discussion.

In an article analysing RC's so-called "attack theory" Steve Carr says that "To counter attacks on RC and its leaders, RC members are instructed to interrupt the person, approach the accusation as the personal problem of the accuser, and vigorously come to the defense of the person or people being attacked."

RC's system of centralised control has been deprecated by ex-members who would have preferred a more accountable leadership. John Heron, once an RC leader and teacher, who left the organization in 1974 to set up his own co-counseling organization, Co-Counselling International, said he parted company with RC because it "systematically conditioned its members to associate a certain kind of beneficial human development with centralized authoritarian control of theory and community policy. It was clear to me that this was pseudo-liberation." He considered that the authoritarianism of RC derived partly from the Leninist doctrines of central control that Jackins had learned in the Communist Party of America and partly from the autocratic example of his former associate L. Ron Hubbard.

See also 
 Co-Counseling
 Harvey Jackins
 Tim Jackins
 List of psychotherapies
 List of counseling topics
 United to End Racism

References

Further reading 
 Edwards, D. J., "The effect on self-actualization of a personal growth programme based on co-counseling", South African Journal of Psychology, 1984, 14(2), 54–56.
 Evison, R. and Horobin, R., "Co-counseling", in Innovative therapy in Britain, Ed. by Rowan, J. and Dryden, W., Milton Keynes: Open University
 Heron, J., "Re-evaluation Counseling", British Journal of Guidance and Counseling, 1972.
 Heron, J., "Re-evaluation counseling: Personal growth through mutual aid", British Journal of Guidance & Counseling, 1973, 1(2), 26–36
 Heron, J., Re-evaluation Counseling: A Theoretical Review, 1973, Guildford: HPRP, University of Surrey
 Jackins, H., Fundamentals of co-counseling manual, 1970, Seattle: Rational Island 
 Jackins, H., The human situation, 1973, Seattle: Rational Island 
 Jackins, Harvey, The List, Seattle: Rational Island Publishers, 1997 
 New, Caroline and Kauffman, Katie, Co-Counselling: The Theory and Practice of Re-Evaluation Counselling, Brunner-Routledge, 2004 
 Rosen, R.D., Psychobabble, Avon Books, 1979 
 Scheff, T.J., "Re-evaluation counseling: social implications", Journal of Humanistic Psychology, April 1972, vol.12, no.1, 58–71
 Somers, B.J., "Re-evaluation therapy: the theoretical framework", Journal of Humanistic Psychology, April 1972, vol.12, no.1, 42–57
 Somers, B. J., "The cocounseling class: People learning to exchange effective help with their distresses", Journal of Human Relations, 1972, 20(4), 475–490
 Wolf, R. B. and Hirsch, B. J., "Outcomes of parent education programs based on reevaluation counseling". Journal of Child and Family Studies, 2003, 12(1), 61–76

External links 
 Re-evaluation Counseling
 Re-evaluation Counseling Resources Site Featuring critical analysis of the RC organization and its doctrines.
 Re-evaluation Counseling Glossary

Anti-psychiatry
Counseling
Human Potential Movement
Scientology-related controversies
Organizations based in Seattle